My Story is a memoir by Australian singer Dannii Minogue. Written in the United Kingdom and Australia with the help of long-time friend Terry Ronald, the book was released in September 2010 in the UK and in October 2010 in Australia.

Having admitted that 2009 has been a life changing year, Dannii felt it was time to put pen to paper and tell it all about the ups and downs of her 38-year life. The pregnancy and arrival of her first son, Ethan, also encouraged her to write the book.

Minogue has used this opportunity to reveal the truth behind her divorce to Julian McMahon and the arguments between her and Sharon Osbourne while on The X Factor in 2007 when Minogue first joined the panel.

The book was serialised by the Daily Mail newspaper in the UK, prior to its release on 30 September.

A paperback edition, featuring an all-new epilogue chapter, was released on 31 March 2011.

References

External links
 My Story -  Simon & Schuster's website.

2010 non-fiction books
Australian autobiographies
Dannii Minogue